Martin Luther McCoy (born August 1, 1973) is an American musician and actor.

Early life
McCoy is a San Francisco native from the Bayview-Hunters Point neighborhood.

Career
Martin collaborated extensively with musicians like The Roots and Cody ChesnuTT and appears as one of the six lead characters in the 2007 Beatles musical Across the Universe in the role of "Jo-Jo", who reflects Jimi Hendrix.  In the film, McCoy performs the song "While My Guitar Gently Weeps", and "Don't Let Me Down" and also provides guitar and vocals on others.

McCoy goes by the stage name of "Martin Luther" in his music career.  For his acting work he is credited under his full name.

Martin Luther developed his mix of musical genres as a child where he was raised on choir hymns through his religious parents. At the same time, he learned how to play piano and was exposed to the sounds of Parliament Funkadelic. These eclectic tastes redirected Martin Luther's interests as he experimented with the sounds of funk. He taught himself how to play the drums and the piano, incorporating the wider range of instruments into his music.

Martin Luther blends gospel with rock and R&B in his music with the release of his first solo album The Calling in 1999, and followed it with an independent release of his second album Rebel Soul Music in 2004 on his own label Rebel Soul Records; his third album "Love is the Hero"  was released in 2012.

While pursuing a music career, Martin Luther continued his education, receiving a degree in Media Arts from Morehouse College with a concentration in Entertainment Law and Marketing and graduated in 1992.

Discography

Albums
 The Calling (1999)
 Rebel Soul Music (2004)
 Love is the Hero (2012)

References

External links
Official Site

Martin Luther Biography

Living people
Singers from San Francisco
The Roots members
1970 births
Male actors from San Francisco
Guitarists from San Francisco
21st-century American singers
Morehouse College alumni
Bayview–Hunters Point, San Francisco